is a Japanese actor. He is represented by Stardust Promotion (Section 2). He was born in Ōita Prefecture and was raised in Kawasaki.

Filmography

TV anime
Pankisu! 2-Jigen (2015) – as Poko Birdland

TV dramas
Mischievous Kiss: Love in Tokyo,  Episode 1 (Fuji TV, 2013), [High school student]
Baseball Brainiacs (NTV, 2014), Kimiyasu Kudo 
Onīchan, Gacha (2015, NTV)
Kaitou Sentai Lupinranger VS Keisatsu Sentai Patranger (TV Asahi, 2018), Keiichiro Asaka/PatrenIchigo (voice)
Kakafukaka (MBS, 2019), Taichi Hase
Time Limit Investigator 2019, Episode 3 (TV Asahi, 2019), Keisuke Kinosaki 
The Story of National Defence Academy (MBS, 2019), Tadashi Harada
Panda Judges the World Episode 5-6 (NTV, 2020), Yoichi Nakanobe 
Only I Am 17 Years Old (Abema TV, 2020), Iori Ishikawa
Ginza Black Cat Story, Episode 6 (Kansai TV, 2020)
Cursed in Love, Episode 1 (NTV, 2020) Endo
The Dangerous Venus (TBS, 2020), Hikaru Kimitsu
Miyako Has Arrived in Kyoto! (2021), Atsuhiko
Kyojo 0 (Fuji TV, 2023), Yawara Oyama

Films
Ichirei shite, Kiss (11 Nov 2017, Tokyu Recreation) – as Shotaro Endo
Genin: Blue Shadow (2019)
Genin: Red Shadow (2019)
Nagi's Island (2022) – as Kōhei Moriya

Stage
Pankisu! 3-Jigen
Stage Super Danganronpa 2 The Stage –Sayonara Zetsubō Gakuen– 2017 – as Izuru Kamukura
Ebisu Chili Dan 5th stage performance Nord
Stage Hyper Production Engeki haikyū!! "Shinka no Natsu" – as Keiji Akaashi

References

External links
  
 

Stardust Promotion artists
21st-century Japanese male actors
Actors from Ōita Prefecture
1994 births
Living people